Docosapentaenoic acid (DPA) designates any straight chain 22:5 fatty acid, that is a straight chain open chain type of polyunsaturated fatty acid (PUFA) which contains 22 carbons and 5 double bonds. DPA is primarily used to designate two isomers, all-cis-4,7,10,13,16-docosapentaenoic acid (i.e. 4Z,7Z,10Z,13Z,16Z-docosapentaenoic acid) and all-cis-7,10,13,16,19-docosapentaenoic acid (i.e. 7Z,10Z,13Z,16Z,19Z-docosapentaenoic acid). They are also commonly termed n-6 DPA and n-3 DPA, respectively; these designations describes the position of the double bond being 6 or 3 carbons closest to the (omega) carbon at the methyl end of the molecule and is based on the biologically important difference that n-6 and n-3 PUFA are separate PUFA classes, i.e. the omega-6 fatty acids and omega-3 fatty acids, respectively. Mammals, including humans, can not interconvert these two classes and therefore must obtain dietary essential PUFA fatty acids from both classes in order to maintain normal health (see essential fatty acids).

Isomers

all-cis-4,7,10,13,16-docosapentaenoic acid (osbond acid)

n-6 DPA is an ω-6 fatty acid with the trivial name osbond acid. It is formed by the stepwise elongation and desaturation of arachidonic acid i.e. 5Z,8Z,11Z,14Z-eicosatetraenoic acid (5,8,11,14-20:4n-6) to the 24 carbon PUFA intermediate (i.e. 6,9,12,15,18:24-5n-6) and the retro-conversion of this intermediate to DPAn-6 as follows:

all-cis-7,10,13,16,19-docosapentaenoic acid (clupanodonic acid)

n-3 DPA is an n-3 fatty acid with the trivial name clupanodonic acid. It is an intermediary between eicosapentaenoic acid (EPA, 5,8,11,14,17-20:5n-3) and docosahexaenoic acid (DHA, 22:6 ω-3) in the following stepwise pathway in which DPAn-3 is a precursor to DHA (6,9,12,15,18,21:24:6n-3) and the final product, 4,7,10,13,16,19-22:6n-3, can be retro-converted to DPAn-3:

Mammalian cells, including human cells, metabolize DPAn-3 to an array of products that are members of the specialized proresolving mediators class of PUFA metabolites. These metabolites include seven resolvins Ds (RvT1, RvT2, RvT3, RvT4, RvD1n-3, RvD2n-3, and RvD5n-3; see specialized proresolving mediators#n-3 DPA-derived resolvins and Resolvin); two protectins (PD1n-3 and PD2n-3; see specialized proresolving mediators#n-3 DPA-derived protectins/neuroprotectins and neuroprotectin); and three maresins (MaR1n-3,  MaR2n-3,and MaR3n-3l see specialized proresolving mediators#n-3 DPA-derived maresins and maresin.

Nutrition
Docosapentaenoic acid (DPA) is an n-3 fatty acid that is structurally similar to eicosapentaenoic acid (EPA) with the same number of double bonds, but two more carbon chain units.

Dietary sources

These are the top five sources for DPA according to the USDA Agricultural Research Service:
 Fish oil, menhaden  0.668g in 1 tbsp. (13.6g)
 Fish oil, salmon 0.407g in 1 tbsp. (13.6g)
 Salmon, red (sockeye), filets with skin, smoked (Alaska Native) 0.335g in 1 filet (108g)
 Fish, salmon, Atlantic, farmed, raw 0.334g in 3 oz (85g)
 Beef, variety meats and by-products, brain, cooked, simmered 0.326g in 3oz (85g)

Seal meat and human breast milk are rich in DPA.

Functions
Clupanodonic acid, an omega-3 fatty acid, along with its metabolite DHA and other long chain omega-3 fatty acids, is under study to determine properties of omega-3 fats in humans, such as in inflammation mechanisms.

See also 
List of omega-3 fatty acids

References

Fatty acids
Alkenoic acids